is a Japanese former footballer who last played for Tochigi SC.

Career
Sakata retired at the end of the 2019 season.

Club statistics
Updated to 10 January 2020.

1Includes J2/J3 Playoffs.

References

External links

Profile at Tochigi SC

1992 births
Living people
National Institute of Fitness and Sports in Kanoya alumni
Association football people from Kumamoto Prefecture
Japanese footballers
J2 League players
J3 League players
Roasso Kumamoto players
Tochigi SC players
Association football defenders